Sinitsyno is a rural locality (a village) in Moshokskoye Rural Settlement, Sudogodsky District, Vladimir Oblast, Russia. The population was 10 as of 2010.

Geography 
Sinitsyno is located 49 km east of Sudogda (the district's administrative centre) by road. Vezhki is the nearest rural locality.

References 

Rural localities in Sudogodsky District